Manonichthys polynemus, the longfin dottyback, is a species of ray-finned fish from the family Pseudochromidae, the dottybacks. It occasionally makes its way into the aquarium trade. It grows to a size of 12 cm in length. This species lives solitarily on steep outer reef slopes and in parts of the reef with dense coral growth. Like its congeners, it has been recorded in the body cavities of large sponges. It is uncommon which has a restricted range, being found in Indonesia off northern Sulawesi and nearby islands, in the southern Philippines and Palau.

See also 
 List of marine aquarium fish species

References

polynemus